Great Parks of Hamilton County is the park district of Hamilton County, Ohio, United States. It was established in 1930, opening its first park, Sharon Woods, in 1932. It was known as the Hamilton County Park District until 2014. The park system includes 18 parks and 4 conservation areas. It is governed by a board of park commissioners. Park headquarters are located in the second largest park in the system, Winton Woods. The county park system also coordinates with the Cincinnati Park Board.

Amenities and activities
The parks are open 365 days a year, from dawn to dusk. Boathouses, golf courses, visitor centers and gift shop hours vary by season. All vehicles entering the parks must have a valid Motor Vehicle Permit ($10 annual for county residents; $16 annual for non-county residents; $5 daily county residents; $8 daily non-county residents). The Great Parks offer reserved banquet centers, lodging, shelters, weddings, and campsites. Campgrounds are only at Miami Whitewater Forest and Winton Woods. The three largest parks are Miami Whitewater Forest, Winton Woods, and Sharon Woods. Things to do at a typical county park are hiking trails (nature, paved, and parcourse), picnicking, fishing, paddle boating, kayaking, canoeing, biking, riding horses, farm animals, playing on playgrounds, golfing (at Miami Whitewater Forest, Winton Woods, Sharon Woods, Woodland Mound, and Little Miami Golf Center), frisbee golf, playing sports, and visiting their nature centers. Dog parks are located at Simmonds Family Dog Park (Miami Whitewater Soccer Complex) and at Otto Armleder Memorial Park & Recreation Complex. Law enforcement services are provided by the Great Parks of Hamilton County Ranger Department, 24/7/365.

List of parks and conservation areas

Parks
Campbell Lakes Preserve 
 Embshoff Woods
Farbach-Werner Nature Preserve
Fernbank Park*
Francis RecreAcres
Glenwood Gardens
Lake Isabella
Little Miami Golf Center (including the southern end of the Little Miami Scenic Trail)
Miami Whitewater Forest
 Mitchell Memorial Forest
Otto Armleder Memorial Park & Recreation Complex*
Sharon Woods
 Shawnee Lookout 
Triple Creek
Werk Road Property
Winton Woods
Withrow Nature Preserve
Woodland Mound

Conservation Areas
Kroger Hills
Newberry Wildlife Sanctuary
Oak Glen Nature Preserve
Richardson Forest Preserve

Asterisk (*) symbolizes parks that are worked through the City of Cincinnati and Hamilton County

Gallery

See also
 Anderson Township Park District

References

External links

 
Park districts in Ohio